The 1942 Mississippi Southern Southerners football team represented Mississippi Southern College (now known as the University of Southern Mississippi) in the 1942 college football season.  The team compiled a 4–0 record in the wartime football setting of WWII, and outscored their opponents by a total of 142 to 7.

Schedule

References

Mississippi Southern
Southern Miss Golden Eagles football seasons
College football undefeated seasons
Mississippi Southern Southerners football